Box is the second boxed set released by Wolfgang Voigt under his Gas alias. The album collects the compact disc versions of Zauberberg, Königsforst , Pop and Oktember. The album marked Voigt's return to the Gas project, with a new album, Narkopop, seeing release the year after Box. The boxed set consisted of 10 vinyl records (3 per album, 1 for Oktember) as well as 4 compact discs and an art book.

Box contains some differences between its contents and the previously issued versions of each album. Apart from overall remastering of the music, several songs appear in slightly longer versions. Notably, the A1 and D1 songs exclusive to the vinyl version of Königsforst were appended to the end of that disc, marking their first digital appearance. Also, the first song of Oktember was replaced with Tal '90, a piece released on Kompakt's compilation Pop Ambient 2002, as the original piece is identical to the first piece of Königsforst.

Track listing

References

External links 
 

Ambient compilation albums
Electronic compilation albums
Gas (musician) albums
2016 compilation albums
Kompakt compilation albums